Basile Essa Mvondo (born 19 April 1978) is a Cameroonian former professional footballer who played as an attacking midfielder.

He played in the successful Cameroon team that won the 1995 African Youth Championship. He made eight appearances for the Cameroon national team, and made the squad for the 1996 African Cup of Nations.

He played his club football with Aigle Royal Menoua in the 1995–96 season, and with Arema F.C. in Indonesia in the 2007–08 season, following which he retired from football.

References 

Living people
1978 births
Association football midfielders
Cameroonian footballers
Cameroon international footballers
Cameroon under-20 international footballers
1996 African Cup of Nations players
Belgian Pro League players
Malaysia Super League players
Singapore Premier League players
Liga 1 (Indonesia) players
Championnat National 2 players
Championnat National 3 players
Aigle Royal Menoua players
Sint-Truidense V.V. players
Stade Beaucairois players
Valenciennes FC players
CO Châlons players
Perak F.C. players
Woodlands Wellington FC players
Arema F.C. players
Cameroonian expatriate footballers
Cameroonian expatriate sportspeople in Belgium
Expatriate footballers in Belgium
Cameroonian expatriate sportspeople in France
Expatriate footballers in France
Cameroonian expatriate sportspeople in Indonesia
Expatriate footballers in Indonesia
Cameroonian expatriate sportspeople in Singapore
Expatriate footballers in Singapore